Yerlanbek Kateuly (born July 16, 1990) is a Chinese-Kazakh freestyle wrestler. He competed in the men's freestyle 65 kg event at the 2016 Summer Olympics, in which he was eliminated in the round of 16 by Ganzorigiin Mandakhnaran.

References

External links
 

1990 births
Living people
Chinese male sport wrestlers
Olympic wrestlers of China
Wrestlers at the 2016 Summer Olympics
Asian Games bronze medalists for China
Wrestlers at the 2014 Asian Games
Asian Games medalists in wrestling
Medalists at the 2014 Asian Games
Wrestlers at the 2018 Asian Games
Chinese people of Kazakhstani descent
Sportspeople from Beijing
21st-century Chinese people